Colonel Edgar Harold Strickland (29 May 1889 Erith - 31 May 1962, Victoria) was an English entomologist who specialized in Diptera and was the founding entomologist at the University of Alberta.

Strickland was born at Erith, Kent. He studied at Wye College with Frederick Vincent Theobald then at Harvard University with a Carnegie studentship. He studied under W. M. Wheeler, working on termites and parasites of Simulium. From 1913 to 1921, he was entomology officer for the province of Alberta based in Lethbridge. He served as a lieutenant in the First World War with the 1st Battalion of the Canadian Machine Gun Corps and was wounded in France in 1918. In 1922, he founded the University of Alberta's entomology department and served as a one-man department until 1946. During the Second World War, he served as a commanding officer of the Army Basic Training Unit at Wetaskiwin and attained the rank of colonel. In 1946, he was joined by Brian Hocking at the entomology department and he retired in 1954.

Strickland wrote 60 entomological papers on ecology, life cycles, taxonomy, and  pest control. He is best known for his prescient 1945 paper, "Could the widespread use of DDT be a disaster?" He was married to Alice Fairfield from 1924 and they had two daughters.

References

External links 
Ball, George E. (6 March 1996). "Reminiscences of 'Strick'" on the occasion of the first annual Strickland Lecture. Archived 26 April 2012.
"E.H. Strickland Entomological Museum"

1889 births
1962 deaths
English entomologists
Canadian entomologists
Harvard University alumni
20th-century British zoologists
20th-century Canadian zoologists
DDT
Military personnel from Kent
Canadian Machine Gun Corps officers
Canadian military personnel of World War I
Canadian Expeditionary Force officers
Canadian Army personnel of World War II
Alumni of Wye College